The canton of Poissons is an administrative division of the Haute-Marne department, northeastern France. Its borders were modified at the French canton reorganisation which came into effect in March 2015. Its seat is in Poissons.

It consists of the following communes:
 
Aillianville
Aingoulaincourt
Annonville
Audeloncourt
Bassoncourt
Bourg-Sainte-Marie
Bourmont-entre-Meuse-et-Mouzon
Brainville-sur-Meuse
Breuvannes-en-Bassigny
Busson
Chalvraines
Chambroncourt
Champigneulles-en-Bassigny
Chaumont-la-Ville
Cirfontaines-en-Ornois
Clinchamp
Doncourt-sur-Meuse
Échenay
Effincourt
Épizon
Germainvilliers
Germay
Germisay
Gillaumé
Graffigny-Chemin
Hâcourt
Harréville-les-Chanteurs
Huilliécourt
Humberville
Illoud
Lafauche
Leurville
Levécourt
Lezéville
Liffol-le-Petit
Longchamp
Maisoncelles
Malaincourt-sur-Meuse
Manois
Mennouveaux
Merrey
Millières
Montreuil-sur-Thonnance
Morionvilliers
Noncourt-sur-le-Rongeant
Orquevaux
Outremécourt
Ozières
Pansey
Paroy-sur-Saulx
Poissons
Prez-sous-Lafauche
Romain-sur-Meuse
Sailly
Saint-Blin
Saint-Thiébault
Saudron
Semilly
Sommerécourt
Soulaucourt-sur-Mouzon
Thol-lès-Millières
Thonnance-les-Moulins
Vaudrecourt
Vesaignes-sous-Lafauche
Vroncourt-la-Côte

References

Cantons of Haute-Marne